Cryptoptila is a genus of moths belonging to the family Tortricidae.

Species
Cryptoptila australana (Lewin, 1805)
Cryptoptila crypsilopha (Turner, 1925)
Cryptoptila immersana (Walker, 1863)
Cryptoptila iubata (Diakonoff, 1953)

See also
List of Tortricidae genera

References

 , 1881, Proc. Linn. Soc. N.S. W. 6: 481. 
 , 2005, World Catalogue of Insects 5.

External links
tortricidae.com

Archipini
Tortricidae genera